1,1-Dichloroethene, commonly called 1,1-dichloroethylene or vinylidene chloride or 1,1-DCE, is an organochloride with the molecular formula CHCl.  It is a colorless liquid with a sharp odor. Like most chlorocarbons, it is poorly soluble in water, but soluble in organic solvents. 1,1-DCE was the precursor to the original clingwrap, Saran, for food, but this application has been phased out.

Production
1,1-DCE is produced by dehydrochlorination of 1,1,2-trichloroethane, a relatively unwanted byproduct in the production of 1,1,1-trichloroethane and 1,2-dichloroethane.  The conversion is a base-catalyzed reaction which uses either NaOH or Ca(OH) with temperature ca. 100 °C. 
ClCHCHCl  +  NaOH   →   ClC=CH  +  NaCl  +  HO
The gas phase reaction, without the base, would be more desirable but is less selective.

Applications
1,1-DCE is mainly used as a comonomer in the polymerization of vinyl chloride, acrylonitrile, and acrylates.  It is also used in semiconductor device fabrication for growing high purity silicon dioxide (SiO) films.

Polyvinylidene chloride

As with many other alkenes, 1,1-DCE can be polymerised to form polyvinylidene chloride. A very widely used product, cling wrap, or Saran was made from this polymer. During the 1990s research suggested that, in common with many chlorinated carbon compounds, Saran posed a possible danger to health by leaching, especially on exposure to food in microwave ovens. Since 2004, therefore cling wrap's formulation has changed to a form of polyethylene.

Safety
The health effects from exposure to 1,1-DCE are primarily on the central nervous system, including symptoms of sedation, inebriation, convulsions, spasms, and unconsciousness at high concentrations.

International Agency for Research on Cancer has put vinylidene chloride in  Class 2B, meaning possibly carcinogenic to humans. National Institute for Occupational Safety and Health considers 1-DCE a potential occupational carcinogen. It is also listed as a chemical known to the state of California to cause cancer and birth defects.

See also
 1,2-Dichloroethene
 Dichloroethane

References

External links
Agency for Toxic Substances and Disease Registry: 1,1-Dichloroethene

Chloroalkenes
Halogenated solvents
Vinylidene compounds